Jodi Lott (born March 27, 1971) is an American politician who has served in the Georgia House of Representatives from the 122nd district since 2015.

Lott was tapped by Governor Brian Kemp in 2021 to serve as one of his four floor leaders in the Georgia House of Representatives during the 2021–2022 term of the General Assembly.

References

External links 
 Jodi Lott at votesmart.org

|-

Republican Party members of the Georgia House of Representatives
1971 births
Living people
21st-century American politicians
21st-century American women politicians
Women state legislators in Georgia (U.S. state)